The Anoaʻi family is a family of professional wrestlers originating from American Samoa. Family members have comprised several tag teams and stables within a variety of promotions. Famous members of the family include WWE Hall of Famers Rikishi, Yokozuna, and brothers the Wild Samoans (Afa and Sika Anoaʻi). Other notable members include Roman Reigns, The Usos (Jey Uso and Jimmy Uso), Umaga, Rosey, and Solo Sikoa. 

Reverend Amituana'i Anoaʻi and Peter Maivia were blood brothers, a connection that continued with Afa and Sika, who regard Peter as their uncle. Peter married Ofelia "Lia" Fuataga, who already had a daughter named Ata, whom he adopted and raised as his own. Ata married wrestler Rocky Johnson, and the couple became the parents of Dwayne Johnson, who wrestled as "Rocky Maivia" and "The Rock" before establishing himself as an actor. Peter's first cousin Joseph Fanene was the father of Savelina Fanene, who is known in WWE as Nia Jax. Savelina also has a younger brother, Hin Hins Man. Trinity Fatu, known in WWE as Naomi, married into the family by marrying Jimmy Uso. Jimmy Snuka is related by marriage, with his children Sarona Snuka, known as Tamina, and Jimmy Snuka Jr, known as Deuce or Sim Snuka, having both wrestled for WWE.

Anoaʻi Family tree

Other members 
Hollywood stuntman Tanoai Reed (known as Toa on the new American Gladiators) is the great nephew of wrestling promoter Lia Maivia (Peter Maivia's wife), while professional wrestler Lina Fanene (Nia Jax) is Dwayne Johnson's second cousin once removed. Johnson's daughter Simone performs in WWE's developmental league NXT as Ava Raine, a member of The Schism, a villainous stable led by Joe Gacy. Sean Maluta, nephew of Afa Anoaʻi, was a participant in WWE's first Cruiserweight Classic tournament. Zilla Fatu, son of the late Eddie “Umaga” Fatu, has begun training at Booker T's Reality of Wrestling.

Tag teams and stables

The Wild Samoans

The Samoan SWAT Team/The Headshrinkers

3-Minute Warning 

In WWE from 2002 to 2003 Matt Anoaʻi and Eddie Fatu formed a tag team using the names Rosey and Jamal, respectively. 3-Minute Warning acted as enforcers for Raw brand General Manager Eric Bischoff. The team was used to squash any activity in the ring that Bischoff deemed "boring". Bischoff would often cue the team's surprise entrances by uttering the phrase "three minutes."

Samoan Gangstas 

Samoan Gangstas was a tag team in the independent promotion World Xtreme Wrestling (WXW). The tag team consisted of members from the Anoaʻi family.

Samoan Gangstas was a tag team made up of brothers from another mothers Matt E. Smalls and Sweet Sammy Silk (Matt and Samu Anoaʻi). Their tag team was formed in 1997 in WXW, the promotion of one half of The Wild Samoans, Samu's father and Matt's uncle Afa Anoaʻi. The duo received success in WXW in the tag team division. On June 24, they won their first WXW Tag Team Championship by beating Love Connection (Sweet Daddy Jay Love and Georgie Love). However, they were temporarily suspended and the title was declared vacant. Matt was repackaged as Matty Smalls. They returned in the summer of 1997 and defeated Siberian Express (The Mad Russian and Russian Eliminator), on September 17 to win their second WXW Tag Team Championship.

Problems began between Smalls and Smooth. The two partners began feuding with each other and could not focus properly on their tag title. On March 27, 1998, Smooth defeated Smalls in a Loser Leaves Town match. As a result of losing this match, Smalls was forced to leave the promotion. He left WXW while Smooth focused on a singles career. After a short while, Smalls returned to WXW and the two partners reunited again as Samoan Gangstas and began teaming in the tag team division. They feuded with several tag teams in WXW and focused to regain the WXW Tag Team Championship. However, due to their family disputes and problems with each other, they did not take part in the tournament for the vacated tag title, and instead feuded with each other. Samoan Gangstas feuded with each other after their splitting until Smalls left WXW and began wrestling as Kimo. He began teaming with Ekmo (Eddie Fatu) as The Island Boyz and the duo worked in Frontier Martial-Arts Wrestling (FMW) before signing with World Wrestling Entertainment (WWE) and working in its developmental territories.

The Sons of Samoa 
The Sons of Samoa are a tag team currently wrestling in the Puerto Rican wrestling promotion World Wrestling Council and WXW. The team consists of Afa Jr. and L.A. Smooth.

The team was formed at WXW in 1998, briefly as a stable with Samu. The team reformed in April 2009 at a WXW show with Afa Jr. and L.A. Smooth. In 2013, they began wrestling at the WWC promotion in Puerto Rico. At Euphoria 2013, they lost to Thunder and Lightning. They won the WWC World Tag Team Championship from Thunder and Lightning on February 9, before losing the titles back to Thunder and Lightning on March 30 at Camino a la Gloria. However, they won the titles on June 29, 2013, at Summer Madness.

The Usos 

The Usos (born August 22, 1985) are a Samoan American professional wrestling tag team consisting of twin brothers Jey Uso and Jimmy Uso, who appear in WWE where they are three-time Raw Tag Team Champions (during their first two reigns, it was called the WWE Tag Team Championship). They are also five-time SmackDown Tag Team Champions—their fifth reign is the longest reign for the title as well as the longest male tag team championship reign in WWE history.. The pair were previously managed by Tamina Snuka and are one-time FCW Florida Tag Team Champions.

The Bloodline 

The Bloodline is a villainous professional wrestling stable currently performing in WWE. The group is led by Roman Reigns, who currently is recognized as the undisputed WWE Universal Champion, as he concurrently holds both the WWE and Universal Championships. Also in the group are Reigns' cousins The Usos (Jey Uso and Jimmy Uso), who are currently recognized as undisputed WWE Tag Team Champions, as they concurrently hold both the Raw and SmackDown Tag Team Championships. The Usos' younger brother Solo Sikoa joined the group in September 2022 and is a former NXT North American Champion. The group is managed by Paul Heyman.

Championships and accomplishments 
 Afa Anoaʻi
Championships and accomplishments
 Dwayne "The Rock" Johnson
 Championships and accomplishments
 Jacob Fatu
 Championships and accomplishments
 Lance Anoaʻi
 Championships and accomplishments
 Lloyd Anoaʻi
Championships and accomplishments
 Peter Maivia
 Championships and accomplishments
 Rikishi
 Championships and accomplishments
 Roman Reigns
 Championships and accomplishments
 Rosey
 Championships and accomplishments
 Sam Fatu
 Championships and accomplishments
 Sika Anoaʻi
Championships and accomplishments
 Solo Sikoa
 Championships and accomplishments
 Umaga
 Championships and accomplishments
 The Usos
 Championships and accomplishments
 Yokozuna
 Championships and accomplishments

See also 
List of family relations in professional wrestling

References

Further reading

External links 
 Samoan Dynasty

 
Professional wrestling families
American families